Jack Cannon (April 19, 1907 – November 12, 1967) was an American football player.  He was elected to the College Football Hall of Fame in 1965. He died of a heart attack on November 12, 1967, in Columbus, Ohio.

References
Billy Amato (Smith) living  nephew

External links

1907 births
1967 deaths
All-American college football players
American football guards
College Football Hall of Fame inductees
Notre Dame Fighting Irish football players